Diena may refer to:

Surname 

Family of Italian philatelists:
 Alberto Diena, (1894–1977)
 Emilio Diena (1860–1941)
 Enzo Diena (1927–2000)
 Mario Diena (1891-1971)
Armando Diena (1914 – 1985), Italian professional football player
Ferruccio Diena (1912 – 1996), Italian professional football player

Given name 

 Diena Georgetti (born 1966), Australian artist

Other 
 Diena, Mali, a town and commune in Mali
 Diena, a newspaper in Latvia
, Lithuanian media group

See also